Barkas may refer to:

Barkas (van manufacturer), a van manufacturer in the German Democratic Republic
Barkas, Hyderabad, a neighbourhood of Hyderabad, India
Barkas (surname)

See also 
Barcas, a notable family in the ancient city of Carthage